Britomartis is a genus of butterflies in the family Lycaenidae.

The genus, which was erected by Lionel de Nicéville in 1895 has two members:
Britomartis cleoboides (Elwes, [1893]) Sikkim - Burma
B. cleoboides viga (Corbet, 1940) Thailand, Peninsular Malaya, Sumatra 
B. cleoboides epigenes (Fruhstorfer, 1912) Java, Bali 
Britomartis igarashii Hayashi, 1976 Borneo, Palawan

Iolaini
Butterflies of Borneo
Lycaenidae genera
Taxa named by Lionel de Nicéville